Nassauville is an unincorporated community in Nassau County, Florida, United States. It is located on the northern bank of the Nassau River, near its northernmost bend.

The Mount Olive Missionary Baptist Church in Nassauville is listed on the National Register of Historic Places.

Geography
Nassauville is located at  (30.56917, -81.51972).

References

Unincorporated communities in Nassau County, Florida
Unincorporated communities in the Jacksonville metropolitan area
Unincorporated communities in Florida